Anvar Yunusov (born February 1, 1987, Dushanbe) is a Tajikistani boxer who currently competes as a professional in the super featherweight division. As an amateur, he won bronze at the 2011 amateur world championships, gold at the 2011 Asian championships, and qualified for the 2008, 2012 and 2016 Olympics. He is also known for giving Asian Games winner Violito Payla his first ever stoppage defeat at the 2007 World Championships.

Amateur career
Southpaw Yunusov beat Bato-Munko Vankeev at the 2005 World Championships but lost to surprise winner Lee Ok-Sung.

He finished second at the 2006 Military World Championships and the Ahmet Comet Cup 2007 where he beat Mirat Sarsenbayev but lost to local Kadri Kordel.

At the 2007 World Championships he stopped Payla, but lost to Samir Mammadov later.

At the 2008 Olympic qualifier he beat Payla again, then Mongol Luvsantseren Zorigtbaatar and North Korean Pak Jong Chol. In Beijing, he lost his quarterfinal to experienced Thai favorite Somjit Jongjohor.

At the 2012 Olympics, he lost his first bout to Oscar Valdez.

He competed in the lightweight division at the 2016 Summer Olympics in Rio de Janeiro. He defeated Shan Jun of China in the first round, but was defeated by Robson Conceição of Brazil in the next round. Yunusov finished 9th overall in the division. He was the flag bearer for Tajikistan during the closing ceremony.

Professional career

References

External links

Living people
Boxers at the 2008 Summer Olympics
Boxers at the 2012 Summer Olympics
Boxers at the 2016 Summer Olympics
Olympic boxers of Tajikistan
1987 births
Boxers at the 2006 Asian Games
Boxers at the 2010 Asian Games
Boxers at the 2014 Asian Games
Tajikistani male boxers
AIBA World Boxing Championships medalists
Sportspeople from Dushanbe
Asian Games competitors for Tajikistan
Bantamweight boxers